Delta Upsilon is an international, all-male, college, Greek-letter social fraternity. The fraternity is structured into six provinces, five in the United States and one in Canada.

Chapters
The following is a list of Delta Upsilon chapters. Active chapters and colonies are indicated in bold. Inactive chapters and colonies are indicated in italic.

References

External links
 Official website

chapters
Lists of chapters of United States student societies by society